Khar Kosh (also Romanized as Khār Kosh) is a village in Qazvineh Rural District, in the Central District of Kangavar County, Kermanshah Province, Iran. At the 2006 census, its population was 15, in 5 families.

References 

Populated places in Kangavar County